Artur Yeghoyan (born 14 September 1990) is an Armenian cross-country skier. He represented Armenia at the FIS Nordic World Ski Championships 2013 in Val di Fiemme, and the 2015 World Championships in Falun. He competed at the 2014 Winter Olympics in Sochi, in the 30 kilometre skiathlon.

References

External links

1990 births
Living people
Cross-country skiers at the 2014 Winter Olympics
Armenian male cross-country skiers
Olympic cross-country skiers of Armenia